Edwin Merrill "Ned" Cushing (September 7, 1830 – December 7, 1903) was an American tenor horn player, auctioneer, and coroner in Staunton, Virginia. Cushing was a charter member and first president of the Stonewall Brigade Band. He was considered a "veritable encyclopedia" of Staunton's town history. He was a town alderman in 1853, 1854, and 1856. His gavel is still kept.

Early years
Cushing was born on September 7, 1830 to Merrill Cushing and Anne Barnes. He married Betty McCoy, daughter of Judson McCoy.

Stonewall Brigade Band
David Drake and Cushing helped found the Stonewall Brigade Band, recruiting A. J. Turner as its first director.

Civil War
Before the war, Cushing was sergeant major of the One Hundred and Sixtieth Regiment, Virginia. He enlisted at the start of war in the quartermaster department. He was released and took part in iron-making in 1863.  He later resumed his position as quartermaster. He reportedly served as a “most efficient member” of the Confederate commissary department and, at one point, was appointed as an overseer of the poor. The band was in the 5th Virginia Infantry Regiment.

Death
Cushing died of acute pneumonia on December 7, 1903. He is buried in Thornrose Cemetery.

References

External links

1830 births
1903 deaths
People from Staunton, Virginia
American auctioneers
American classical horn players
Confederate States Army personnel
19th-century American businesspeople
19th-century American male musicians